Jones Channel is an ice-filled channel,  long and  wide, lying between Blaiklock Island and the south part of Arrowsmith Peninsula and connecting Bourgeois Fjord with the head of Bigourdan Fjord, off the west coast of Graham Land. It was occupied by the Jones Ice Shelf, since the latters disintegration in 2003 it is free of ice. 

The channel was named for Harold D. Jones, a Falkland Islands Dependencies Survey (FIDS) airplane mechanic at Stonington Island, 1947–49, who was a member of the FIDS party which discovered, surveyed, and sledged through it in 1949.

References

Channels of the Southern Ocean
Straits of Graham Land
Loubet Coast